District 5 is an urban district (quận) of Ho Chi Minh City, the largest city in Vietnam. The Chinese community accounts for a significant population in this district. There are several hospitals, high schools and universities in this district.

As of 2010 the district had a population of 174,154 people. The district covers an area of 4.27 km².

There are 15 wards in District 5, from Ward 1 to Ward 15.

Famous places 
Cholon, the Chinatown of Ho Chi Minh City
 Windsor Plaza Hotel (5 stars), the current tallest building in District 5 
 Hải Thượng Lãn Ông historic quarter (selling Chinese and Vietnamese herbs)
 Đại Thế Giới Water Park
 District 5 Cultural Centre
 Kim Biên market (selling chemical substances)
 An Đông market

Idioms 
Eat in District Five, Live in District Three and See in District One.

Location within Ho Chi Minh City

High Schools and Universities
 Hùng Vương High School
  Lê Hồng Phong High School for the Gifted
 High School for the Gifted
 Ho Chi Minh City Pedagogical University
 Ho Chi Minh City University of Science
 Ho Chi Minh City Medicine and Pharmacy University
 Ho Chi Minh City Sports Pedagogical University

References

Districts of Ho Chi Minh City